KHEC (91.1 FM) is a radio station licensed to Crescent City, California, United States.  The station is currently owned by Southern Oregon University.

References

External links

HEC
Radio stations established in 2011
2011 establishments in California
Southern Oregon University
Classical music radio stations in the United States